Devil's Partner is a 1958 American film starring Ed Nelson, directed by Charles R. Rondeau and produced by Hugh Hooker, an actor and stuntman who had previously made the 1958 film The Littlest Hobo.  However the film was not released until 1961 when it was acquired by Roger and Gene Corman's Filmgroup as a double feature with Creature from the Haunted Sea The film was co-written by actor Stanley Clements and Laura Jean Mathews.

Plot summary 
Set in rural Furnace Flats, New Mexico, the film opens with a hunched old man, Pete Jensen, slaughtering a goat and daubing its blood within a hexagon drawn on the floor of his shack. Days later, a young man, Nick Richards, arrives in town, asking about Pete, claiming he is his uncle. The town's sheriff informs Nick that Pete is dead. Nick decides to set up residence in Pete's shack. While there, he engages in a series of demonic rituals designed to drive a wedge between pretty Nell Lucas and her fiancé, auto-mechanic David Simpson. One evening, after a date with Nell, David is mysteriously attacked and disfigured by his pet dog. Nick offers to substitute for David at his gas station while he recovers. Those alerted to Nick's presence notice that even though it's incredibly hot, the immaculately dressed Nick fails to perspire. Yet with the exception of the sheriff's dog, the town's inhabitants feel comfortable in his presence.

Meanwhile, further animal-related incidents occur. A local drunk is trampled by a horse. A plastic surgeon dies when a cow lays down in the road in front of his speeding car, causing him to crash. Later, a rattlesnake threatens David in his bedroom, but he shoots the varmint before it escapes. Eventually, the town doctor finally guesses that Nick, the victim of demonic possession, is behind the hostile animal incidents. He further theorizes (correctly) that the old man, Pete, and his nephew Nick are actually one and the same. In the film's climax, the doctor and the sheriff, along with Nell and David, witness Nick transforming into a stallion. As he gallops away, however, the sheriff brings him down with several gunshots. At this point, David's facial wound miraculously disappears and the film ends on a happy note with the townsfolk standing over Nick's body in a field.

Cast 
Ed Nelson as Nick Richards / Pete Jensen
Edgar Buchanan as Doc Lucas
Jean Allison as Nell Lucas
Richard Crane as David Simpson
Spencer Carlisle as Sheriff Tom Fuller
Byron Foulger as Papers
Claire Carleton as Ida
Brian O'Hara as Harry Matthews
Harry Fleer as John Winters
Joe Hooker as Deputy Joe
Hugh Hooker as Mr. Johnson
Riley Hill as Frank

Production note
While several characters in the film claim to have seen a centaur, one never appears on-screen even though one appears on the poster advertising the movie.

Critical reaction
Author/critic Bryan Senn wrote that director Charles R. Rondeau "cuts through the bull to deliver an atmospheric, intimate little supernatural thriller." Praising the "earnest" cast members, including Jean Allison and Edgar Buchanan, Senn continues that even if the film is "perhaps predictable...you could do far worse than to shake hands with The Devil's Partner.

Horror-film scholar Eric Michael Mazur has identified Devil's Partner as part of a scary sub-genre that took advantage of the early 1960's obsession with "hysteria over juvenile delinquency and the accessibility of strange new religions." As a result of these social concerns, an environment resulted where "the Devil film became nearly ubiquitous."

Commenting on Devil's Partner, critic David Goldweber was delighted by the film's blending of "sweet 1950s small-town ambience with shape-shifting devil worship." While admitting that he "might be overrating it because I like this kind of thing...the acting, directing, script, and dialogue are all above average."

References

External links 

1958 films
1961 horror films
1961 films
American supernatural horror films
Works based on the Faust legend
American black-and-white films
Films scored by Ronald Stein
1960s English-language films
1950s English-language films
1950s American films
1960s American films